Micajah W. Kirby (September 20, 1798 Easton, Washington County, New York – March 28, 1882 Rochester, Monroe County, New York) was an American politician from New York.

Life
He was the son of Elihu Kirby (1761–1811) and Patience (Gifford) Kirby (1762–1825).

He was a member of the New York State Assembly (Monroe Co.) in 1836. He lived in Henrietta, New York.

On November 11, 1841, he married Lucretia Whitaker (c. 1814–1852), and they had three children.

He was a member of the New York State Senate (27th D.) in 1852 and 1853.

Sources
The New York Civil List compiled by Franklin Benjamin Hough (pages 137, 142, 218 and 286; Weed, Parsons and Co., 1858)
Kirby genealogy at RootsWeb
Tombstone transcriptions from Calkins Cemetery in Henrietta

1798 births
1882 deaths
Democratic Party members of the New York State Assembly
Democratic Party New York (state) state senators
People from Easton, New York
People from Henrietta, New York
19th-century American politicians